Okalongo is a settlement in the Omusati Region of northern Namibia, situated  from Outapi. It is the district capital of the Okalongo Constituency.

Okalongo and the surrounding area is inhabited by the Ombadja tribe of the Ovambadja people that migrated from southern Angola, to the northern Namibia during the late 18 centuries to the early 19 centuries. It is situated in the north of Namibia in the area known as Ovamboland. Okalongo is one of the places that suffered a lot during the colonial era. In 1983 the South African forces established the military base in Okalongo.

Okalongo is home to the Okalongo Traditional Authority, a tribal administrative division of the Ovambo people.

External links

Ovambo
Populated places in the Omusati Region